A chimney is a conduit for exhausting combustion gases up into open air.

Chimney or Chimneys may also refer to:
 Chimney (locomotive), specifically for chimneys fitted to railway locomotives
 Funnel (ship), chimney or smokestack on a ship
 Chimney, Oxfordshire, hamlet in England
 Chimney (sculpture), outside Riley Hospital for Children, Indianapolis
 Chimneying, rock-climbing technique
 Chimneys (play) by Agatha Christie
 Chimneys novels, two light-hearted thrillers by Agatha Christie
 Fairy chimney, tall thin rock formation
 Methane chimney, underground gas buildup
 Solar chimney, method of heating a building using passive solar energy
 Chimney swift, Chaetura pelagica
 Chimney crayfish, Cambarus diogenes
 Chimney bellflower, Campanula pyramidalis

See also
Places
 Chimney Cove, Newfoundland and Labrador
 Chimney Peak, Canadian Rockies
 Chimney Point, Vermont
 Chimney Rock (disambiguation) various places
 Chimney Tickle, Newfoundland and Labrador
 Big Chimney, West Virginia
 Big Chimneys, historic site in Falls Church, Virginia
 Ivy Chimneys, Epping Forest District, Essex
 Natural Chimneys, regional park in northwestern Virginia
Other
 Chimney cake, kürtőskalács or cozonac secuiesc, Transylvanian pastry
 Tulips and Chimneys, poetry collection by E. E. Cummings